Gerald Penn is an American computer scientist specializing in mathematical linguistics and speech processing. He is a professor of computer science at the University of Toronto, a senior member of IEEE and AAAI, and a past chair of Association for Mathematics of Language.

Education 
Penn received a B.S. in mathematics from the University of Chicago and Ph.D. in computer science from Carnegie Mellon University. His Ph.D. thesis was nominated by Carnegie Mellon School of Computer Science for the ACM Doctoral Dissertation Award.

Career 
Penn is a past recipient of the Ontario Early Researcher Award. His joint work with Geoffrey Hinton and Hui Jiang on signal processing with neural networks revolutionized acoustic modelling for speech recognition systems, and received the Best Paper Award from IEEE Signal Processing Society. He has led numerous research projects, including those funded by Avaya, Bell Canada, CAE, the Connaught Fund, Microsoft, NSERC, the German Ministry for Training and Research, SMART Technologies, the U.S. Army and the U.S. Office of the Director of National Intelligence.

References 

American computer scientists
Living people
University of Chicago alumni
Carnegie Mellon University alumni
Academic staff of the University of Toronto
Year of birth missing (living people)
Speech processing researchers
Computational linguistics researchers